Borsch or Börsch is a German and North American last name which is either derived from the first name of Latin origin Liborius or from a diminutive of the Slavic personal name Borislav (from Proto-Slavic *boriti "to battle" and *slàva "glory, fame").
Notable people with the surname include:
 Anton Börsch  (1854–1920), German geodesist, astronomer, and geophysicist
 Axel Börsch-Supan (born 1954), German economist 
 Frederick H. Borsch (1935–2017), American clergyman
 Karl Borsch (born 1959), German clergyman
 Stefan Borsch (born 1947), Swedish musician
 Willie Borsch (1930–1991), American AA/FA and funny car drag racer

References

External links 

German-language surnames
Surnames from given names